Aongstroemia is a genus of mosses belonging to the family Dicranaceae.

The genus has cosmopolitan distribution.

There are 75 accepted species, including:
 Aongstroemia aciculata Müll.Hal. 
 Aongstroemia alpina Müll.Hal.

References

Dicranales
Moss genera